Surviving Jack is an American sitcom that aired as a mid-season replacement on Fox as part of the 2013–14 American television season. On May 8, 2013, Fox placed a thirteen-episode order for the single-camera comedy. The pilot is written by Justin Halpern and Patrick Schumacker, and the series is based on Halpern's autobiographical book I Suck at Girls. On October 25, 2013, the order of episodes was cut to eight, due to scheduling restrictions.

On May 7, 2014, Fox canceled the series after one season, and 7 episodes broadcast, leaving a single episode unaired, and the remaining episodes have never been circulated. They later aired the last episode, episode eight, in New Zealand on TV2.

Synopsis

Set in Southern California, in 1991, the series centers on Jack Dunlevy, an ex-military man and no-nonsense guy who becomes a full-time parent when his wife decides to go to law school. He takes an unorthodox approach to keeping his teenagers, Frankie and Rachel, in line.

Cast
 Christopher Meloni as Dr. Jack Dunlevy, a blunt talking, former military man, now a doctor, who, after many years, is assuming the parent responsibilities now that his wife is going back to law school.
 Rachael Harris as Joanne Dunlevy, a loving wife and mom, who is going back to law school. She longs to have her home be the neighborhood "hangout house."
 Connor Buckley as Frankie Dunlevy, a typical, awkward freshman teenager, who is usually the focus point of all of Jack's parenting mistakes.
 Claudia Lee as Rachel Dunlevy, a super conceited, over confident, super popular senior in high school. She can't stand any of her brother Frankie's friends.
 Kevin Hernandez as George, Frankie's best friend since 2nd grade. He has a huge crush on Rachel.
 Tyler Foden as Mikey, one of Frankie's best friends, who comes from a broken home. This is his second year as a freshman.
 Mell Bowser as Craig

Critical reception

Review aggregation website, Rotten Tomatoes gives Surviving Jack  a score of 68% average rating of 6.2 out of 10, based on 31 reviews. The website’s consensus reads: "Christopher Meloni's comedic chops help sell Surviving Jack's fresh twist on gender roles and the traditional sitcom formula, even if the show falls a little flat in other areas." Metacritic gives the show a weighted average score of 65 out of 100, based on reviews from 24 critics, indicating "generally favorable" reviews.

Episodes

References

External links
 

2010s American single-camera sitcoms
2014 American television series debuts
2014 American television series endings
English-language television shows
Fox Broadcasting Company original programming
Television shows based on books
Television series by Warner Bros. Television Studios
Television series set in the 1990s
Television series set in 1991
Television shows set in California